Teligi may refer to:
Teligi, India, a village in Karnataka, India
Teligi, Russia, a rural locality (a selo) in Megino-Kangalassky District of the Sakha Republic, Russia